John Mansel was a general.

John Mansel may also refer to:

Sir John Mansel, England's first Secretary of State
John Mansel of the Mansel Baronets

See also
John Mansell (disambiguation)